Daniel Mateo Rodas Jiménez (born 11 January 1998) is a Colombian footballer who plays as a centre back for Patriotas Boyacá.

Career
Following a career in his native Colombia with Deportivo Cali, Barranquilla and Tigres, Rodas moved to the United States in 2020, joining USL League One side Orlando City B. He was released at the end of the season.

References

External links
 Orlando City profile

1998 births
Living people
Colombian footballers
Footballers from Bogotá
Association football defenders
Deportivo Cali footballers
Barranquilla F.C. footballers
Tigres F.C. footballers
Orlando City B players
Patriotas Boyacá footballers
Categoría Primera B players
USL League One players
Colombian expatriate footballers
Expatriate soccer players in the United States
Colombian expatriate sportspeople in the United States